Aleksandr Baranov may refer to:

Alexander Andreyevich Baranov (1746–1819), first Chief Manager of the Russian America Company
Aleksandr Baranov (actor) (1914–1995), Soviet actor; see The Adventures of Buratino (1959 film)
Alexander Ivanovich Baranov (born 1946), Russian Army Colonel General
Aleksander Baranov (director) (born 1955), Russian film director and screenwriter of Catherine
Aleksandr Baranov (skater), Soviet former 5000m speed skating world record holder
Alyaksandr Baranaw (born 1974), Belarusian footballer

See also
Alexander Barankov (born 1981), Belarusian whistleblower